Vi vil oss et land... (We Want Ourselves a Country) was a 1936 election propaganda film for the Norwegian Conservative Party, directed by Leif Sinding. The title is taken from a poem by Per Sivle.

Plot
The film showed, among other things, how unnecessary the workers' strikes were and how unnecessarily high the taxes were. In one scene, a man in a suit is pulled by trolls to Dovregubben's Hall. Dovregubben turns out to be ruled by the evil "communist" Norwegian Labor Party.

Cast
Eugen Skjønberg as Kåre Fjell, a bookkeeper
Erna Schøyen as Marie Fjell, Kåre Fjell's wife
Else Heiberg as Dagny Fjell, daughter of Kåre and Marie
Jon Lennart Mjøen as Frithjof Eker
Sophus Dahl as Amund Fisker
Oscar Egede-Nissen as a worker
Arne Kleve as Anders, an old townsman
Per Kvist as the treasurer
Leif Norder as Tor Skar, the editorial secretary for Morgenrøden
Ellen Sinding as a dancer
Einar Tveito as Per Lium, a smallholder

References

External links
 
 Vi vil oss et land... at the National Library of Norway

1936 films
Norwegian black-and-white films
Conservative Party (Norway)